Wágner Pires de Almeida (born 27 December 1973) is a Brazilian football player.

Club statistics

References

External links

Cerezo Osaka

1973 births
Living people
Brazilian footballers
Brazilian expatriate footballers
Campeonato Brasileiro Série A players
J1 League players
Expatriate footballers in Poland
Expatriate footballers in Japan
Esporte Clube XV de Novembro (Piracicaba) players
Clube Atlético Mineiro players
Guarani FC players
Mirassol Futebol Clube players
União São João Esporte Clube players
Esporte Clube Santo André players
Figueirense FC players
Botafogo Futebol Clube (SP) players
Uberlândia Esporte Clube players
Adap Galo Maringá Football Club players
América Futebol Clube (RN) players
Pogoń Szczecin players
Cerezo Osaka players
Association football forwards
Footballers from Porto Alegre